Justin Hugh Armour (born January 1, 1973) is a former professional American football player who played wide receiver for three seasons for the Buffalo Bills, Denver Broncos, and Baltimore Ravens. He is also the former head coach of the Manitou Springs High School football team in Manitou Springs, Colorado, along with being the current girls' basketball head coach.

High School
Justin was a Consensus All-American with the Manitou Springs Mustangs. In high school, he helped the Mustangs to a AA state track and field championship in the spring of 1990 and a AAA state championship in the fall of 1990. The Mustangs football team primarily ran the Single-wing formation which fit Justin's extensive athletic abilities.  Justin was coached by George Rykovich.

College career
Justin received an athletic scholarship to play both football and basketball at Stanford University.  While recruited as a quarterback, he played four years at wide receiver for the Cardinal coached by Bill Walsh and two years of basketball. As a sophomore, he received an honorable mention All-Pac-10. As a junior, he was selected as All-Pac-10 second-team. As a senior, he ranked ninth in the nation and second in the Pac-10 in receptions. He also set the school career mark with 2,482 receiving yards.

Professional career
Justin was drafted in the fourth round (113th overall) of the 1995 NFL draft by the Buffalo Bills. He was a member of the Denver Broncos Super Bowl XXXIII championship team, defeating the Atlanta Falcons 34-19.

References

1973 births
Living people
American football wide receivers
Buffalo Bills players
Denver Broncos players
Baltimore Ravens players
Stanford Cardinal football players
Philadelphia Eagles players